Drasteria chinensis is a moth of the family Erebidae. It is found in Kyrgyzstan, Kazakhstan, Mongolia and China (Gansu).

References

Drasteria
Moths described in 1892
Moths of Asia